Claire Chazal (born 1 December 1956) is a French journalist, romance writer, and former director of news at a national television station, France 2.

She had been the weekend news anchor at TF1 beginning in 1991, and gave her final broadcast at the station on September 13, 2015; Anne-Claire Coudray, who had often substituted for her when she was absent, was announced as her replacement. Between 2010 and 2015, she had also been the host of Reportage at 1.30pm, after the news.

She used to host Je/nous de Claire a talk-show on the gay television channel Pink TV that she helped start in 2004. (The title of this show puns on Le Genou de Claire, a French film known in English as Claire's Knee.) 
  
Chazal obtained an HEC School of Management diploma.

External links

 Profile at imédias website 

1956 births
Living people
People from Thiers
French journalists
French women journalists
French television presenters
French women television presenters
French television journalists
HEC Paris alumni
French Confederation of Christian Workers members
Paris 2 Panthéon-Assas University alumni
Chevaliers of the Légion d'honneur